Bel Ami is a 1955 historical drama film directed by Louis Daquin and starring Anne Vernon, Renée Faure and Jean Danet. It was a co-production between Austria, France and East Germany. The film was shot in the Soviet-controlled Rosenhügel Studios in Vienna.

It is an adaptation of the 1885 novel Bel Ami by Guy de Maupassant.

Cast
French Version
 Jean Danet as Georges Duroy, called "Bel Ami"
 Anne Vernon as Clothilde de Marelle
 Renée Faure as Madeleine Forestier
 René Lefèvre as Le banquier Walter
 Christl Mardayn as Virginie Walter
 Maria Emo as Suzanne Walter  
 Jacqueline Duc as Rachel  
 Jean-Roger Caussimon as Charles Forestier  
 Lukas Ammann as Le ministre Laroche-Mathieu  
 Egon von Jordan as Le reporter Saint-Potin

German Version
 Johannes Heesters as Georges Duroy, called "Bel Ami"
 Gretl Schörg as Clothilde de Marelle
 Marianne Schönauer as Madeleine Forestier
 René Lefèvre as Le banquier Walter
 Christl Mardayn as Virginie Walter
 Maria Emo as Suzanne Walter  
 Jacqueline Duc as Rachel  
 Jean-Roger Caussimon as Charles Forestier  
 Lukas Ammann as Le ministre Laroche-Mathieu  
 Egon von Jordan as Le reporter Saint-Potin

References

Bibliography 
 Williams, Alan. Film and Nationalism. Rutgers University Press, 2002.

External links 
 

1955 films
1950s historical films
French historical drama films
German historical drama films
Austrian historical drama films
East German films
1950s German-language films
Films directed by Louis Daquin
Films set in Paris
Films set in the 1880s
Films based on French novels
Films based on works by Guy de Maupassant
Remakes of German films
Austrian multilingual films
Remakes of Austrian films
Films shot at Rosenhügel Studios
German multilingual films
1950s multilingual films
Works based on Bel-Ami
1950s French films
1950s German films